Muhsin Musabah Faraj Fairouz (born October 1, 1964) is a retired United Arab Emirati footballer. He played as a goalkeeper for the United Arab Emirates national football team as well as the Sharjah Club in Sharjah.

Musabah played all of his country's games in qualifying for the 1990 FIFA World Cup and started all three games in the tournament. He was also an important player for his country's run to the final of the 1996 AFC Asian Cup. With over 100 caps to his name, Musabah, who wore the No. 17 jersey throughout his international career, is considered to be the greatest goalkeeper to represent the UAE.

International career statistics

See also
 List of men's footballers with 100 or more international caps

References

External links
Muhsin Musabah at FIFA.com

1964 births
Living people
People from the Emirate of Sharjah
Emirati footballers
1988 AFC Asian Cup players
1990 FIFA World Cup players
1992 AFC Asian Cup players
1996 AFC Asian Cup players
1997 FIFA Confederations Cup players
FIFA Century Club
United Arab Emirates international footballers
UAE Pro League players
Sharjah FC players
Association football goalkeepers
Footballers at the 1994 Asian Games
Asian Games competitors for the United Arab Emirates